The New Archie and Sabrina Hour  (advertised as The Archie-Sabrina Show) is the seventh and final animated series featuring Archie Comics characters under the Filmation banner. The series premiered on NBC in September 1977, rebroadcasting segments from The Archie Show, as well as brand-new segments featuring Sabrina the Teenage Witch. The show's format featured three segments per episode: a 15-minute one, a 30-minute one, and another 15-minute one—with the segments separated by songs (two songs per episode) and the first segment invariably featuring and emphasizing Sabrina.

Filmation added two new characters into the show: a Latino teenager named Carlos and a robot that Dilton Doiley got from a space center and rebuilt named Q. Carlos only made a few appearances in the comics, beginning in Life with Archie #179 (March 1977). Q was Filmation's nod to Star Wars. At the time, robots were starting to appear everywhere, even on primetime shows.

Low ratings caused the hour-long format to be shelved by October. The show was retooled, then divided into separate 30-minute shows: The Bang-Shang Lollapalooza Show featured Archie's Gang solving mysteries around Riverdale (each 30-minute segment), while Super Witch featured Sabrina solving mysteries using her powers (each pair of 15-minute segments); each show featured one song per episode. The low ratings continued, however, and all three shows were gone by the spring of 1978—thus ending the Archie Comics/Filmation partnership. A failed attempt to continue with the Archie Comics franchise led to The Kid Super Power Hour with Shazam! show in 1981, which would have had the Archie characters as superheroes; however, the rights had lapsed, forcing Filmation to create new superheroes similar to the Archie ones-these heroes became part of the 'Hero High' animated segments along with  the 'Shazam' ones.

The new segments from this show are listed by Entertainment Rights as The Archie and Sabrina Surprise Package.

Cast
 Dallas McKennon as Archie Andrews, Hot Dog, Mr. Weatherbee, Chuck Clayton, Pop Tate, Mr. Lodge, Salem, Ronnie, Clyde, Batso, Goo, additional voices
 José Flores as Carlos
 Howard Morris as Jughead Jones, Moose Mason, Dilton Doiley, Cousin Ambrose, Hexter, Frankie, Wolfie, Dr. Jekyll and Hyde, Mummy, Hauntleroy, Orville, additional voices
 John Erwin as Reggie Mantle, Ratso, Q, additional voices
 Jane Webb as Betty Cooper, Veronica Lodge, Miss Grundy, Big Ethel, Sabrina Spellman, Aunt Hilda Spellman, Aunt Zelda Spellman, Miss Della, Bella La Ghostly, additional voices
Larry D. Mann as Boneapart, additional voices
Larry Storch as Drac, Hagatha, Ghoulihand, Icky, additional voices

Episodes
Each hour-long episode was composed of three segments: An Archie short, a Sabrina short, plus a 30-minute Archie episode. Sabrina sometimes appeared in all three cartoons.

Home media 
In the 1980s, New Age Video Inc. released two VHS releases of the syndication version of the format, Archie's Millions and Archie and Sabrina the Teenage Witch.

In 2009, the complete series was released on Region 4 DVD in Australia and New Zealand as The Archie and Sabrina Surprise Package.

References

Additional source
 Lenburg, Jeff, Encyclopedia of Animated Cartoons, First Edition.

External links 
 
 Episode index at the Big Cartoon DataBase

1970s American animated television series
NBC original programming
Television shows based on Archie Comics
Television series by Universal Television
1977 American television series debuts
1978 American television series endings
Television series by Filmation
Sabrina the Teenage Witch
Teen animated television series
Crossover animated television series
American animated television spin-offs
American children's animated comedy television series
Television series created by Jim Ryan (writer)